Lantau is one of the 10 constituencies in the Islands District in Hong Kong. It covers the largest part of Lantau Island and nearby outlying islands apart from other constituencies in Tung Chung and Discovery Bay.

The constituency returns one district councillor to the Islands District Council, with an election every four years.

Lantau constituency has an estimated population of 24,685.

Councillors represented

Election results

2010s

References

Constituencies of Hong Kong
Constituencies of Islands District Council
1994 establishments in Hong Kong
Constituencies established in 1994
Lantau Island